The Rashtriya Sikh Sangat ("National Sikh Association") is an India-based Sikh affiliate of the Rashtriya Swayamsevak Sangh (RSS)

About
With about 450+ ekais (shakas, units) predominantly in the states of Rajasthan, Haryana, Punjab, Gujarat, Delhi, Uttar Pradesh, Madhya Pradesh, Maharashtra and as also presence in other states. Rashtriya Sikh Sangat was inspired by the Hindu nationalist organization Rashtriya Swayamsevak Sangh to unite Hindus and Sikh.

List of Leaders

Attacks on its Leaders

In 2009, Babbar Khalsa, a Khalistani militant organization assassinated Rulda Singh, the then president of the Rashtriya Sikh Sangat, in Patiala.

Controversies 
The Akal Takht issued a Hukam Nama (an edict) to the Sikh community in 2004 to not lend support to this organization as it does not represent Sikh interests.  The edict stands, even now.

In 2004, the leader of the Akal Takht declared that the organization to be "anti-Sikh" and "anti-panthic". It forbade all Sikhs from having any association with it.  The Akal Takht, (the supreme temporal body of the Sikh community worldwide) reiterated the ban again in 2019 and is seen as an attempt by the Rashtriya Swayamsevak Sangh (RSS) to promote Hindutva, to Sikhs and an attempt to assimilate (absorb) Sikhs into Hinduism.

See also

 Sangh Parivar
 Bharatiya Janata Party
 Rashtriya Swayamsevak Sangh (RSS)
 Muslim Rashtriya Manch
 Keshdhari Hindus
 Sanatan Sikh

References 

Religious organisations based in India
Sangh Parivar
1986 establishments in India
Sikh organisations